David R. Gamperl (born December 24, 1966) is an American businessman from the Chicago area.

Early life and education
Gamperl received his bachelor's degree from Quincy University in 1989. He graduated with an MBA from the Kellstadt Graduate School of Business, DePaul University's College of Commerce in 1995.  While at DePaul, Gamperl won first prize in the University's start-up business plan contest.

Career
After graduating from DePaul, Gamperl entered the food industry. His first business, America's Finest Pasta Sauces, shipped  2,400 10-pound packages of pasta sauce,  earning $1.2 million in its first year and $3 million in its second year. In 1999, Gamperl sold the business to Dell’Alpe Foods and the Flying Noodle company.

From 1999 to 2005, Gamperl owned Top Shelf distributing GE, Duracell and Gillette products to major supermarket concerns. (Albertsons and Safeway, both ranked in the "Top 75 North American Food Retailers for 2008" according to Supermarket News.) In 2005, Gamperl sold Top Shelf to TruServ Corporation (True Value Company).

In 2006, Gamperl launched Blueleaf Lending, a Chicago bank focused on residential property and neighborhood revitalization, serving as CEO until 2008. 

Gamperl was the CEO of Mercantile Oil & Gas, Inc., located in Galena Park, Texas. While managing the company, he raised over $550 million to acquire oil and gas production facilities, including an oil refinery and oil production facilities in Colorado and Utah. 

Mercantile Oil & Gas Producing Corporation is a private company categorized under Oil and Gas Producers. Established in 1965, and incorporated in Texas, the company has an annual revenue of 22,500,000 and employs a staff of approximately 102. 

Gamperl remains active in real estate in Chicago. This includes holding $20 million in commercial real estate.  His entity Fulton & Ogden LLC owns the over 150,000 square feet of land and buildings in the Chicago Fulton Market District. The Chicago Fulton Market properties are estimated to be worth $43 million.

Philanthropic activities include founding member of the DePaul Blue Angel Network and advisory board member of the DePaul University Coleman Entrepreneur Center.

Personal life
Gamperl married journalist Anna Davlantes; the couple had a daughter, Gabriella Britton Davlantes Gamperl, in 2011.

References

1966 births
Businesspeople from Chicago
DePaul University alumni
American people of Italian descent
Living people
Missing middle or first names